{{DISPLAYTITLE:C16H23NO}}
The molecular formula C16H23NO may refer to:

 Anazocine, an opioid analgesic
 Benzofuranylpropylaminopentane, a stimulant
 Dezocine, an opioid analgesic
 Inaperisone, a muscle relaxant
 α-PHiP, a psychoactive drug
 Pyrovalerone, a psychoactive drug
 α-Pyrrolidinohexiophenone, a stimulant
 Tolperisone, a muscle relaxant